Jetadmin was a computer program produced by Hewlett-Packard for administration of network printers.  It ran on the following operating systems:
 Windows 3.x, 95, 98, NT, and 2000
 HP-UX 9.x and lower, 10.x, 11.x
 Solaris 2.4 and lower, 2.5, 2.5.1, 2.6
 SunOS
 OS/2
 DOS

Hewlett-Packard declared HP Jetadmin obsolete as of 31 Jan 2002. It has been replaced with HP Web Jetadmin.

References

Computer printing